Brigitte Aubert (born in Cannes in March 1956) is a French writer of detective fiction. She has done some screenwriting and had works adapted for film.

Novels

 1992 : Les Quatre fils du Docteur March
 1993 : La Rose de fer
 1994 : Ténèbres sur Jacksonville
 1996 : La Mort des bois (published in English as Death from the Woods)
 1997 : Requiem Caraïbe
 1998 : Transfixions
 2000 : La Morsure des ténèbres
 2000 : Éloge de la phobie
 2000 : La Mort des neiges (published in English as Death from the Snows)
 2000 : Le Couturier de la mort
 2001 : Descentes d`organes
 2002 : Funérarium (Seuil "Policiers")
 2004 : Rapports brefs et étranges avec l'ombre d'un ange (Flammarion "Flammarion noir")
 2005 : Le Chant des sables (Le Seuil "Thriller")
 2005 : Nuits noires : recueil de nouvelles (Fayard "Fayard noir")
 2006 : Une âme de trop (Seuil Policiers)

Awards 
1997 Grand Prix de Littérature Policière

References 

1956 births
People from Cannes
Living people
French mystery writers
French women novelists
Women mystery writers
20th-century French women writers
20th-century French novelists
21st-century French women writers